Rodrigo Córdoba (born 25 March 1995) is an Argentine professional footballer who plays as a midfielder for Argentine Primera División side Temperley.

Career
Córdoba's opening club of his career was Temperley. He made his career debut on 10 May 2016 during a Copa Argentina encounter with Estudiantes of Primera B Nacional, participating for the full duration of a home defeat. He was subsequently selected as a substitute for Argentine Primera División matches against Newell's Old Boys, Racing Club and Belgrano during 2016 but went unused on all three occasions.

Career statistics
.

References

External links

1995 births
Living people
Place of birth missing (living people)
Argentine footballers
Association football midfielders
Argentine Primera División players
Club Atlético Temperley footballers